Events from the year 1845 in Canada.

Incumbents
Monarch: Victoria

Federal government
Parliament: 2nd

Governors
Governor General of the Province of Canada: Charles Poulett Thomson, 1st Baron Sydenham
Governor of New Brunswick: William MacBean George Colebrooke
Governor of Nova Scotia: Lucius Cary, 10th Viscount Falkland
Civil Governor of Newfoundland: John Harvey
Governor of Prince Edward Island: Henry Vere Huntley

Premiers
Joint Premiers of the Province of Canada —
William Henry Draper, Canada West Premier
Samuel Harrison, Canada East Premier

Events
Halifax native Samuel Cunard chooses Boston as the western terminus for his steamships.
Lord Cathcart, the new governor, arrives.
The Rebellion Losses Commission sits.
The Welland Canal is opened.

Births

January to June
January 9 – Laure Conan, novelist (died 1924)
January 14 – Henry Petty-Fitzmaurice, 5th Marquess of Lansdowne, Governor General of Canada (died 1927)
February 13 – William James Topley, photographer (died 1930)
April 5 – Leonard Burnett, politician, farmer and teacher (died 1932)
May 4 – Louis Henry Davies, lawyer, businessman, politician and 3rd Premier of Prince Edward Island (died 1924)

July to December
July 9 – Gilbert Elliot-Murray-Kynynmound, 4th Earl of Minto, Governor General of Canada (died 1914)

July 20 – Charles-Eusèbe Dionne, naturalist and taxidermist (died 1925)
August 6 – John Campbell, 9th Duke of Argyll, Governor General of Canada (died 1914)
November 10 – John Sparrow David Thompson, lawyer, judge, politician, and 4th Prime Minister of Canada (died 1894)
December 15 – Edward Charles Bowers, politician (died 1929)

Deaths

References

 
Canada
Years of the 19th century in Canada
1845 in North America